Bright Matsiwe (born 25 May 1996) is a Zimbabwean cricketer. He made his first-class debut on 12 December 2019, for Mid West Rhinos in the 2019–20 Logan Cup. He made his List A debut on 22 April 2021, for Rhinos, in the 2020–21 Pro50 Championship.

References

External links
 

1996 births
Living people
Zimbabwean cricketers
Mid West Rhinos cricketers
Place of birth missing (living people)